Artur Detko (born 18 February 1983 in Radomsko) is a Polish cyclist, who last rode for UCI Continental team .

Major results

2007
 5th Memoriał Henryka Łasaka
2008
 2nd Memoriał Andrzeja Trochanowskiego
 3rd Overall Dookoła Mazowsza
1st Stage 5 (TTT)
 3rd Grand Prix Kooperativa
 5th Majowy Wyścig Klasyczny-Lublin
 5th Coupe des Carpathes
 9th Overall Szlakiem Walk Majora Hubala
 9th Pomorski Klasyk
2009
 1st Overall Tour of Małopolska
1st Stage 1
 1st Overall Pomerania Tour
1st Stages 1 & 2
2010
 1st Stage 1 Bałtyk–Karkonosze Tour
 5th Pomerania Tour
2011
 1st Stage 6 Bałtyk–Karkonosze Tour
 9th Overall Dookoła Mazowsza
2012
 3rd Coupe des Carpathes
2013
 9th Overall Course de Solidarność et des Champions Olympiques
2014
 1st Stage 1 Bałtyk–Karkonosze Tour
 3rd Visegrad 4 Bicycle Race – GP Polski Via Odra
 7th Overall Memorial Grundmanna I Wizowskiego
 9th Overall Tour of Małopolska
 10th Overall Course de Solidarność et des Champions Olympiques
 10th Overall Dookoła Mazowsza
2015
 3rd Memorial Grundmanna I Wizowskiego
2016
 3rd Memoriał Henryka Łasaka
 4th Korona Kocich Gór
 6th Visegrad 4 Bicycle Race – GP Czech Republic
 6th Memorial Grundmanna I Wizowskiego
2017
 3rd Memoriał Henryka Łasaka
 9th Memorial Grundmanna I Wizowskiego
2019
 2nd Memoriał Henryka Łasaka
 7th Coupe des Carpathes
 8th Visegrad 4 Bicycle Race – GP Polski

References

External links

1983 births
Living people
Polish male cyclists
People from Radomsko
Sportspeople from Łódź Voivodeship